Lincoln DeWitt (born April 24, 1967) is an American skeleton racer who competed from 1997 to 2004. He won a bronze medal in the men's skeleton event at the 2001 FIBT World Championships in Calgary.

A native of Syracuse, New York, who also grew up in Pownal, Vermont, DeWitt graduated from the University of Pennsylvania with an economics degree. He also finished fifth in the men's skeleton event at the 2002 Winter Olympics in Salt Lake City.

DeWitt also won the men's Skeleton World Cup overall title in 2000-1.

References
2002 men's skeleton results
ESPN The Magazine February 18, 2002 article on the US skeleton team for the 2002 Winter Olympics in Salt Lake City.
List of men's skeleton World Cup champions since 1987.
Men's skeleton world championship medalists since 1989
Skeletonsport.com profile
Dave Jereckie: the most highly qualified cross-country ski teacher one will likely ever encounter

1967 births
American male skeleton racers
Living people
Sportspeople from Syracuse, New York
Sportspeople from Vermont
Skeleton racers at the 2002 Winter Olympics
University of Pennsylvania alumni
Olympic skeleton racers of the United States